Summer Loving or Summer Lovin' can refer to:

Summer Lovin', a single by house music duo Musikk.
Summer Lovin' (Modern Family), the season premiere of the seventh season of the American sitcom Modern Family.
Summer Loving (Shameles), the second episode of season 2 of American television comedy-drama series Shameless.
Summer Nights (Grease song), a song from the musical Grease.

See also
 Summer Love (disambiguation)
 Summer of Love (disambiguation)